Sultan Abdullah Al-Deayea (Arabic: سلطان عبد الله الدعيع; born 7 March 1993) is a Saudi Arabian football player who currently plays as a defender.

References

External links
 

Saudi Arabian footballers
Association football defenders
Al Hilal SFC players
Al-Shabab FC (Riyadh) players
Al-Faisaly FC players
Al-Fateh SC players
Al-Shoulla FC players
Al-Kawkab FC players
1993 births
Living people
Saudi Professional League players
Saudi First Division League players